Copadichromis azureus is a species of haplochromine cichlid. It is endemic to Lake Malawi where it is found in the country of Malawi.

References

Endemic fauna of Malawi
azureus
Taxa named by Ad Konings
Fish described in 1990
Taxonomy articles created by Polbot
Fish of Malawi
Fish of Lake Malawi